Ugolino and his sons may refer to:

 The account of Ugolino della Gherardesca's imprisonment in the 13th century,
 Ugolino and His Sons (Carpeaux), a sculpture by Jean-Baptiste Carpeaux inspired by the above
 Ugolino and His Sons (Rodin), a sculpture by Auguste Rodin